The Arroyo Grande Valley AVA is an American Viticultural Area located in San Luis Obispo County, California. It is part of the larger Central Coast AVA with the area composrd of sedimentary and volcanic soils over a layer of bedrock known as the Franciscan Complex. The valley is divided by a fog line produced by the cool coastal fogs where Zinfandel, Petite Sirah and Rhône varietals are grown on the higher elevations near Lopez Lake and the cooler mid-valley vineyards being home to Chardonnay and Pinot noir.

References

American Viticultural Areas
American Viticultural Areas of California
Geography of San Luis Obispo County, California
Arroyo Grande, California
Valleys of San Luis Obispo County, California
1990 establishments in California